Crocomela conscita is a moth of the subfamily Arctiinae. It was described by Herbert Druce in 1903. It is found in Peru.

References

Arctiinae
Moths described in 1903